Pad Abort 1 (PA-1) was a flight test of the Orion Launch Abort System (LAS). PA-1 was the first test in a sequence of atmospheric flight tests known as Orion Abort Flight Test (AFT).

PA-1 tested the basic functionality of the launch abort concept from the pad in its preliminary Orion design configuration. It  used the former conformal shape of the LAS adapter. The Flight Test Article (FTA) vehicle differed from production Orion vehicles in a number of ways. For example, the FTA did not have a crew on board, and the avionics were a prototype of what is planned for production Orions.

The PA-1 Test took place at the U.S. Army's White Sands Missile Range in New Mexico.

Spacecraft location
The Orion capsule used in the test is on display at the Virginia Air and Space Center in Hampton, Virginia.

Gallery

References

External links

 Orion Pad Abort 1 Video Highlights at Vimeo – http://vimeo.com/11631855

Orion (spacecraft)
Constellation program missions
Test spaceflights
2010 in spaceflight
2010 in New Mexico